George Somerville (born c. 1860) was a Scottish footballer who played as a forward.

Career
Born in Glasgow, Somerville played club football for Uddingston, Rangers and Queen's Park, and made one appearance for Scotland in 1886, scoring on his international debut. He won the Scottish Cup with Queen's Park in 1885–86.

References

1860 births
Year of birth uncertain
Scottish footballers
Scotland international footballers
Rangers F.C. players
Queen's Park F.C. players
Association football forwards
Year of death missing
Place of death missing